The 1963 Sandown International Cup was a motor race for Formula Libre cars, staged at Sandown Park, in Victoria, Australia on 11 March 1963. 
It was the second annual Sandown International Cup, the two races serving as the forerunners of the Sandown round of the annual Tasman Series from 1964 to 1975.

The race was won by Bruce McLaren driving a Cooper T62 Coventry Climax.

Results

Note:
 Pole position: Bruce McLaren, 1m 10.4s
 Winner's race time: 1h 10m 03.8s

References

External links
 Images of "Open Wheelers 1963" at autopics.com.au

Sandown International Cup
Motorsport at Sandown
March 1963 sports events in Australia